The temple of Seti I also known as the Great Temple of Abydos is one of the main historical sites in Abydos. The temple was built by pharaoh Seti I. At the rear of the temple there is the Osireion.

The temple is also notable for the Abydos graffiti, ancient Phoenician and Aramaic graffiti found on the temple walls.

Documentation 
The temple was described by pioneer archaeologist Flinders Petrie. The temple was documented in 1933 in a four-volume series entitled The Temple of King Sethos I at Abydos. The books were largely devoted to the exceptional copies of the temple's wall paintings done by Ms. Amice Calverley.

Abydos King List 

The long list of the pharaohs of the principal dynasties—recognized by Seti—are carved on a wall and known as the "Abydos King List". There were significant names deliberately left off of the list. As an almost complete list of pharaoh names, the Table of Abydos, rediscovered by William John Bankes, has been called the "Rosetta Stone" of Egyptian archaeology, analogous to the Rosetta Stone for Egyptian writing, beyond the Narmer Palette.

Helicopter hieroglyphs 

The "helicopter" image is the result of carved stone being re-used over time.  The initial carving was made during the reign of Seti I and translates to "He who repulses the nine [enemies of Egypt]".  This carving was later filled in with plaster and re-carved during the reign of Ramesses II with the title "He who protects Egypt and overthrows the foreign countries".  Over time, the plaster has eroded away, leaving both inscriptions partially visible and creating a palimpsest-like effect of overlapping hieroglyphs.

Dorothy Eady 

Dorothy Louise Eady, also known as Omm Sety (16 January 1904 – 21 April 1981), was keeper of the Temple of Seti I in Abydos.

Notes

Egyptian temples
Seti I
Abydos, Egypt sites